The Bulgarian football league system or the Bulgarian football pyramid, is a series of interconnected leagues for club football in Bulgaria. The system has a hierarchical format with promotion and relegation between leagues at different levels, and allows even the smallest club to dream of rising to the very top of the system.

History 
The first organised national tournament was founded in 1924. It was called the National championship. The teams taking part in the tournament were separated in different regional divisions and the winners of each division then played for the Championship title via play-offs.

In 1948 A Republican Football Group was founded, a new national top division. The second level of the football league system - the B Republican Football Group was founded two years later. The lower levels of the pyramid - V Republican Football Group and below - were structured in 1959.

This system (with minor changes during the years) existed until 2000. Then experimentally a new Bulgarian Premier Football League was founded replacing A Football Group. B Football Group was replaced by the new Bulgarian First Football League. But these changes lasted for just three years - in 2003 the old A and B Football Groups were restored at the top of the football pyramid.

From 2016 the top level league name was changed to First Professional Football League and B Group name to Second Professional Football League.

Structure 
Currently the Bulgarian football league system consists of 55 different divisions forming 5 levels of the pyramid.:

References

External links
 bulgarian-football.com - information, results, fixtures and tables from all levels of Bulgarian club football
 Bulgarian Football Union Information System - includes information, results, fixtures and tables from the lower levels of Bulgarian club football (levels 3-5)

 
Football league systems in Europe